The 1997 Individual Ice Speedway World Championship was the 32nd edition of the World Championship  The final was held on ?, 1997 in Assen in the Netherlands. 

Kirilł Drogalin of Russia won the world title.

Classification

See also 
 1997 Speedway Grand Prix in classic speedway
 1997 Team Ice Racing World Championship

References 

Ice speedway competitions
World